Subdued is a 2017 Iranian romantic drama film directed by Hamid Nematollah and written by Masoumeh Bayat. The film stars Leila Hatami, Koroush Tahami, Elham Korda, and Leila Moosavi.

Cast
 Leila Hatami as Mina
 Koroush Tahami as Kamran
 Elham Korda as Ayla
 Leila Moosavi as Mrs. Mansouri
 Khosrow Bamdad as Mina's father
 Asghar Piran as Kamran's labor
 Ghezaleh Jezayeri as fast food cashier
 Behzad Rahimkhani as dentist
 Hojjat Hassanpour Sargaroui as Mojtaba
 Bamdad Nematollah as Ayla's son
 Azita Lachini as hospital owner

References

External links
 

2017 films